Trifun "Triša" Kaclerović (Serbian Cyrillic: Триша Кацлеровић; 14 February 1879 – 31 March 1964) was a Serbian politician, journalist and lawyer. He was one of the founders of the Serbian Social Democratic Party, and later a founder and Secretary General of the Communist Party of Yugoslavia.

Biography 
Kaclerović joined the socialist movement in the Kingdom of Serbia at a young age. On March 23, 1903, About 5,000 students and workers took part in demonstrations against the absolutist regime of Serbian King Aleksandar Obrenovic, organized by socialist students Dimitrije Tucović and Kaclerović. The rally ended in violence, with five people killed and six wounded in a clash with police in Belgrade. More than 120 demonstrators were arrested, 27 were indicted, and Tucović and Kaclerovic emigrated from the country.

Kaclerović was one of the founders of the Serbian Social Democratic Party and the Main Workers' Union. In cooperation with Dimitrije Tucović, he worked on the creation of a socialist federation of Balkan nations. He was elected MP twice. In 1908, when he was the only member of the Social Democratic Party in the Assembly, and in 1912, when Dragiša Lapčević was also a member of parliament. Kaclerović often interpreted the political moves of Pasic's radicals as "an order coming from Moscow".

On August 22, 1911, Užice Socialists convened a large workers 'assembly in  due to non-compliance with the Law on Strikes, at which Triša Kaclerović spoke on behalf of the Main Party Administration and the Main Workers' Union. 

Kaclerovic was one of the founders of the Socialist Workers' Party (Communist) in April 1919 and a member of the Central Party Council since September 1919. He was elected MP on the Communist Party of Yugoslavia list in November 1920. From the spring of 1921 he was in the leading party bodies of the CPY. In August 1921, he was the secretary of the then illegal Communist Party of Yugoslavia.

He was a member of the Central Committee, the legal, Independent Workers' Party of Yugoslavia ( 1923-1924 ). He was Delegate to the Fifth Congress of the Comintern in 1924. In 1928 withdrew from all political activities. Kaclerović was the only CPY secretary general to survive Great Purge of the 1930s.

After the establishment of the Socialist Federal Republic of Yugoslavia, he was a member of the Provisional National Assembly and served as a judge of the Supreme Court of the Federal People's Republic of Yugoslavia. Kaclerović retired in 1948 and died in 1964 in Belgrade.

References 

1879 births
1964 deaths
20th-century Serbian lawyers
Serbian journalists
Yugoslav lawyers
Yugoslav journalists
Serbian trade unionists
Serbian communists
League of Communists of Yugoslavia politicians
Central Committee of the League of Communists of Yugoslavia members